Kevin Porter (born April 11, 1966) is an American football coach and former player. He played professionally as a defensive back for the Kansas City Chiefs and New York Jets in the National Football League (NFL). Porter served as the head coach for the Kansas City Brigade of the Arena Football League (AFL) from 2006 to 2008, compiling a record of 13–20, including a 0–1 mark in the postseason. In 2010, he was the head football coach at Avila University. For the fall of 2011, Porter became the athletic director and football coach at Georgia's Point University. He was the head football coach at Fort Valley State University in Fort Valley, Georgia from 2016 to 2019. He is currently the head coach at Central State University in Wilberforce, Ohio

Head coaching record

College

References

External links
 Fort Valley State profile
 
 Kevin Porter at ArenaFan Online

1966 births
Living people
American football cornerbacks
American football safeties
Af2 coaches
Kansas City Command coaches
Auburn Tigers football players
Avila Eagles football coaches
Central State Marauders football coaches
Fort Valley State Wildcats football coaches
Kansas City Chiefs players
Macon Knights coaches
MidAmerica Nazarene Pioneers football coaches
New Orleans VooDoo coaches
New York Jets players
Orlando Predators coaches
Point Skyhawks athletic directors
Point Skyhawks football coaches
West Georgia Wolves football coaches
Sportspeople from the Bronx
Players of American football from New York City
People from Warner Robins, Georgia
Coaches of American football from Georgia (U.S. state)
Players of American football from Georgia (U.S. state)
African-American coaches of American football
African-American players of American football
20th-century African-American sportspeople
21st-century African-American people